Alexis Jordan is the debut and only studio album by American singer Alexis Jordan. It was released from February 25, 2011, through Roc Nation. After being signed to rapper Jay-Z's Roc Nation label in March 2010, Jordan began working with Norwegian production duo Stargate on the album, Jordan also worked with producers Sandy Vee, Nightwatch, Espionage. The album was recorded between January 2007 and October 2010.

Alexis Jordan received generally positive reviews from music critics, who complimented its upbeat material and the album's lyrics, with one critic feeling "Her lyrics are unbridled enough to melt an ice-cold heart" and another praising it for being "dancefloor friendly". However, some critics found the album lacked a distinct style and compared the album to the music of Barbadian singer Rihanna. The album debuted at number nine in the United Kingdom. The album also debuted at number eleven in Australia. On April 30, 2011, the album debuted at number 80 on the Dutch Albums Chart. In its 13th week the album shot from 72 to 23, reaching its peak of 21 two weeks later

The album was preceded by the lead single "Happiness" on September 7, 2010; it peaked at number three in the United Kingdom and Australia, while it became a top-ten hit in Belgium (Flanders), New Zealand, and Poland. The song also reached number one on the US Hot Dance Club Songs chart. The second single "Good Girl" peaked at number six in the UK on February 27, 2011, and also reached the top of the US Hot Dance Club Songs chart. The third and final single, "Hush Hush", peaked at number 36 in Ireland and 66 in the UK from strong downloads from the album, almost one month before the single's official release.

Background

Jordan began writing songs while she was in third grade. At the age of 11, she moved with her parents and three younger siblings Taylor, Malichai and Malcolm to Santa Clarita, California, to pursue a career in the arts. At the age of 12, Jordan served as an opening act for Smokey Robinson at a Stevie Wonder tribute concert.
In 2006 Jordan auditioned for the first season of America's Got Talent. She sang Whitney Houston's "I Have Nothing" at her audition and made it through to next round, only to be eliminated in the semifinals. After being eliminated from the show, Jordan and her family moved to Atlanta to be closer to the music industry. While there, she began to upload cover songs on YouTube while submitting demos. By 2008, Jordan's YouTube page was racking up millions of views. The exposure led Jordan to the attention of production team Stargate who called her to fly to New York and record a few songs with them. While in the studio, rapper Jay-Z walked in, which ultimately resulted in Jordan becoming the first artist signed to the new, Sony Music-affiliated label, StarRoc/Roc Nation – a joint venture between Stargate and Jay-Z's Roc Nation label.

In an interview with Digital Spy Alexis Jordan revealed that one of the tracks on her new album is dedicated to her fans. She described the song "Say That" as a "thank you" to her fans who have stood by her over the past two years.
"I would say it's one of those records that is dedicated to my fans," she told Digital Spy. "I'm saying, 'say that it's us' - that even if things don't work out - then at least we still have each other!

"I have to thank my fans on this record because they've been more supportive than I could have ever imagined. This is the song where I'm asking them to stay with me."

Discussing the sound of the track, she said: "This is my country one, but there's also a bit of reggae in there too. It's one of the earlier tracks I recorded that I loved to death. I kept it aside right at the beginning of the project, so it's stayed with just me for a very long time!"

Singles
"Happiness" was released as the album's lead single on September 7, 2010. It peaked at number three in the UK and Australia, while it became a top-ten hit in Belgium (Flanders), New Zealand, and Poland. The song also peaked at number one on the US Hot Dance Club Songs chart. In the United States, "Happiness" debuted on the Hot Dance Club Songs chart at number forty. It climbed the chart in subsequent weeks and peaked at the top position for the week of July 17, 2010. The song held the position for one week before losing it to Wynter Gordon's "Dirty Talk". Also in the US, the song reached number one on the Hot Dance Airplay chart. In the United Kingdom, the song debuted and peaked at number three for the week ending November 13, 2010. It made its Irish debut at number 36 and peaked at number thirty-one. On the European Hot 100 Singles chart, "Happiness" reached number 13. In Australia, the song debuted on the ARIA Singles Chart at number 25 on December 19, 2010, before peaking at number three in its sixth week on the chart. It has since been certified triple platinum by the Australian Recording Industry Association (ARIA) for sales of 210,000 units. In April 2011, the song reached number one for six weeks on the Dutch Single Top 100, staying on the chart for 44 weeks in total.

"Good Girl" was released as the second single from the album on February 18, 2011. On February 24, 2011, "Good Girl" debuted at number 18 in Ireland, and has since peaked at number 15. In the United Kingdom, the song debuted at number six on February 27, 2011, becoming Jordan's second top-ten single in the UK. In the United States, the song debuted at number 14 on Billboards Hot Dance Club Songs chart on the issue dated March 19, 2011. It reached the top of the chart on the issue dated April 30, 2011, becoming Jordan's second consecutive number-one hit in the US.

"Hush Hush" was released as the third single from the album. It was released in the United Kingdom on June 12, 2011. The song peaked at number 36 in Ireland, and 66 in the UK from strong downloads from the album, almost one month before the official release.

Reception

Critical reception

The album received mixed reviews from most music critics, with many comparing the sound of the album to Barbadian R&B singer Rihanna but criticizing the album for being too predictable. Natalie Shaw of BBC Music categorized the album as bubblegum pop and praised its lyrics, opining "Her lyrics are unbridled enough to melt an ice-cold heart – she sings about wanting to walk in high heels, and how she enjoys listening to her crush's voice as he talks to her on the phone. While this may sound unbearably twee, it's that very focus on a pure, single-minded crush that makes it; the mood and upbeat tempo of this album as a whole has all of the excitement of that very feeling." The Guardians Caroline Sullivan dismissed Alexis Jordan's voice, writing "Jordan is reputed to have a voice worth hearing, but here it's been AutoTuned or buried under layers of Stargate's trademark clattery beats, to the point where any distinctiveness is lost." Matthew Laidlow of Virgin Media felt the album was sufficient for a debut release but criticized the lack of a consistent dance-pop sound, remarking "Instead [...] there is a collection of songs that just cast the impression the producers working with Alexis Jordan tried all sorts of sounds to suit her, couldn't nail a distinct style and just put the collective efforts on the album."

Hermione Hoby of The Observer gave the album a negative review, saying "Jordan's only 18 but has worked for almost half a decade to release this debut. [...] So it's a shame that she doesn't have much more to say here than "I want to walk in the club with my high heels on." Like Jordan's naughty-girl/good-girl shtick, these tunes are depressingly predictable." In his review for The Border Mail, Jamie Horne compared the songs "Habit" and "How You Like Me Now" to Rihanna, noting the latter song's similarity to "Umbrella" (2007). He found the album "dancefloor friendly", commenting how Jordan "seems to be joining R&B stars like Chris Brown, Rihanna and Usher [who] have all upped their BPMs of late." OK! Magazine gave the album a positive review, judging "It's jam-packed with ridiculously catchy electro-infused pop that's likely to get stuck in your head for days. Highlights include Good Girl, Hush Hush and Happiness, any of which would shoot straight to the top of the charts if released by Girls Aloud or The Saturdays."

Chart performance
The album debuted at number twenty-eight in Ireland on March 4, 2011. In the United Kingdom, the album debuted at number nine on March 6, 2011. The album also debuted at number eleven in Australia. On April 30, 2011, the album debuted at number 80 on the Dutch Albums Chart. In its 13th week the album shot from 72 to 23, reaching its peak of 21 two weeks later.

Track listing

Notes
"Happiness" contains an excerpt of "Brazil (2nd Edit)" as performed and written by deadmau5.
"Shout Shout" contains elements from "Shout" as performed by Tears for Fears and written by Roland Orzabal and Ian Stanley.

Charts

Certifications

Release history

References

2011 debut albums
Alexis Jordan albums
Albums produced by Stargate
Columbia Records albums
Roc Nation albums